Belleville (French, literally "beautiful town") may refer to:

Places

Canada
 Belleville, New Brunswick, an unincorporated community in Wakefield Parish
 Belleville, Nova Scotia
 Belleville, Ontario

France
 Belleville, Deux-Sèvres, in the Deux-Sèvres département
 Belleville, Meurthe-et-Moselle, in the Meurthe-et-Moselle département
 Belleville, Paris is a neighbourhood of Paris, previously the center of an independent commune annexed by the City of Paris in 1860
Belleville (commune), that independent commune
Belleville (Paris Métro), metro station named for commune
 Belleville, Rhône, in the Rhône département
 Belleville-en-Caux, in the Seine-Maritime département
 Belleville-et-Châtillon-sur-Bar, in the Ardennes département
 Belleville-sur-Loire, in the Cher département
 Belleville-sur-Mer, in the Seine-Maritime département
 Belleville-sur-Meuse, in the Meuse département
 Belleville-sur-Vie, in the Vendée département
 Saint-Martin-de-Belleville, in the Savoie département

United States
 Belleville, Arkansas
 Belleville, California
 Belle Ville, a settlement of African Americans established in McIntosh County, Georgia during the Reconstruction Era
 Belleville, Illinois, the largest US city named Belleville
Belleville (St. Louis MetroLink)
Roman Catholic Diocese of Belleville
 Belleville, Indiana
 Belleville, Kansas
 Belleville, Michigan
 Belleville, Missouri
 Belleville, Nevada
 Belleville, New Jersey
 Belleville, New York
 Belleville, North Dakota
 Belleville, Pennsylvania
 Belleville, Tennessee
 Belleville, Virginia
 Belleville, West Virginia
 Belleville, Wisconsin

Places elsewhere in the world
 Belleville, Galway, a community in Galway East, Ireland
 Belleville, Bouaké, neighbourhood of Bouaké, Ivory Coast
 Belleville, Sassandra-Marahoué, village in Ivory Coast

Other uses
 Frederic De Belleville, Belgian-American actor
 Belleville boiler, a British water-tube boiler, modelled after a French design by Julien Belleville
 Belleville, a fictional city in the French animated movie The Triplets of Belleville
"Belleville Rendez-vous" (song), a song in the movie
 Belleville washer, a type of spring
 Belleville (2011), a Drama Desk Award nominated play by Amy Herzog

See also
Bella Villa, Missouri
Bellville (disambiguation)
Belville (disambiguation)